The 2015–16 Ranji Trophy is the 82nd season of the Ranji Trophy, the premier first-class cricket tournament in India. It is being contested by 27 teams divided into three groups of nine teams each.
Top three teams advance to knockout stage and ninth place team will be relegated to Group C for 2016–17 Ranji Trophy.

Squads

Points table

Fixtures

Round 1

Round 2

Round 3

Round 4

Round 5

Round 6

Round 7

Round 8

Round 9

References

External links
 Series home at ESPNCricinfo
 Series home at Bcci.tv

Ranji Trophy seasons
Ranji Trophy Trophy
Ranji Trophy
Ranji Trophy